Ursun is a rural locality (a selo) in Shimikhyusky Selsoviet, Kurakhsky District, Republic of Dagestan, Russia. The population was 86 as of 2010. There are 4 streets.

Geography 
Ursun is located 14 km northwest of Kurakh (the district's administrative centre) by road, on the Khpedzhchay River. Shimikhyur and Khpyukh are the nearest rural localities.

Nationalities 
Lezgins live there.

References 

Rural localities in Kurakhsky District